Trachylepis brevicollis, the short-necked skink or Sudan mabuya, is a species of skink found in Sudan, Ethiopia, Eritrea, Somalia, Kenya, Uganda, Tanzania, Yemen, Saudi Arabia, and Oman.

References

brevicollis
Reptiles described in 1837
Taxa named by Arend Friedrich August Wiegmann